Giulia Zardini Lacedelli (born 29 January 2003 in Pieve di Cadore) is an Italian curler from Cortina d'Ampezzo. She is the current lead on the Italian women's curling team. She competed for Italy at the 2019 European Curling Championships and the 2020 World Qualification Event. She was going to play for Italy at the 2020 World Women's Curling Championship, but it was cancelled due to the COVID-19 pandemic.
She also competed at the World Women’s Curling championships in 2021 as well as in 2022.
She took part of the European’s Women’s curling Championship in Lillehammer in 2021, and in Helsingborg in 2022.

Personal life
As of 2020, she is a student.

References

External links

Living people
2003 births
Italian female curlers
People from Cortina d'Ampezzo
Sportspeople from the Province of Belluno
21st-century Italian women